Valtteri Virkkunen (born 18 February 1991) is a Finnish former professional ice hockey forward who played for Espoo Blues and SaiPa in the Finnish Liiga. He competed for Finland and won a bronze medal at the 2009 IIHF World U18 Championships in the United States.

References

External links

1991 births
Living people
Espoo Blues players
Sportspeople from Espoo
Finnish ice hockey forwards